Titouan Thomas (born 12 January 2002) is a French footballer who plays as a midfielder for Dutch side ADO Den Haag, on loan from Estoril.

Club career
Born in Plouisy, Thomas began his career with local side AS Plélo, before spending time in the academies of La Châtelaudrinaise, Guingamp and Stade Briochin. He joined Olympique Lyonnais in 2017, signing a professional contract with the club in June 2019. During his time with Olympique Lyonnais, he was seen as one of the club's most promising young players. He was linked with a loan move away from the club in August 2021, having been brought on the first-team's pre-season tour by manager Peter Bosz.

However, on 30 June 2022, he joined Portuguese side Estoril on a free transfer. Having failed to break into the Estoril first team, he was loaned to Dutch side ADO Den Haag only a short while after signing.

International career
Thomas has represented France at youth international level.

Career statistics

Club

Notes

References

2002 births
Sportspeople from Côtes-d'Armor
Living people
French footballers
France youth international footballers
Association football midfielders
En Avant Guingamp players
Stade Briochin players
Olympique Lyonnais players
G.D. Estoril Praia players
ADO Den Haag players
Championnat National 2 players
Eerste Divisie players
French expatriate footballers
French expatriate sportspeople in Portugal
Expatriate footballers in Portugal
French expatriate sportspeople in the Netherlands
Expatriate footballers in the Netherlands